The Copa del Rey 2007-08 was the 72nd edition of the Spanish basketball Cup. It was organized by the ACB and was disputed in Vitoria-Gasteiz, Basque Country in the Fernando Buesa Arena between days 7 and 10 of February. The winning team was DKV Joventut.

Brackett

Quarterfinals

SemiFinals

Final

Barclaycard MVP of the Final: Rudy Fernández

Television Broadcasting
TVE2, FORTA and Teledeporte.

Organizer
ACB and the Ayuntamiento de Vitoria-Gasteiz.

Sponsorships
Nike, Mahou-San Miguel and Winterthur Group.

External links
2007/2008 Copa del Rey Official Website

Copa del Rey de Baloncesto
2007–08 in Spanish basketball cups